

Events calendar

+05